Top of the Morning: Inside the Cutthroat World of Morning TV is a 2013 non-fiction book by the media critic Brian Stelter. The book was first published on April 23, 2013, through Grand Central Publishing and centers on the world of morning television. A lengthy excerpt appeared in The New York Times Magazine in the week before publication.

Synopsis
In Top of the Morning, Stelter discusses several daytime television shows, their hosts, and events that he observed while working as a media reporter for The New York Times. The book focuses heavily on Ann Curry's replacing Meredith Vieira on the Today show, as well as covering other events such as the rivalry between Good Morning America and Today over morning television ratings.

Reception
Critical reception for Top of the Morning has been mixed. The Washington Times gave a mostly positive review for the book, while Entertainment Weekly gave a mixed one. Entertainment Weekly stated while the book's quality improved as it progressed, the book was unlikable, and some elements - such as Robin Roberts' cancer - "has been documented better elsewhere". The Pittsburgh Post-Gazette and The Hollywood Reporter both panned the book, with the Pittsburgh Post-Gazette criticizing it as reading "more like a dispatch from someone working at TMZ than a New York Times reporter".

Television adaptation
On December 17, 2013, the Lifetime television network announced it was adapting the book into a two-hour television film, but by 2016 the cable network's option on the project had lapsed. 

The book now serves as inspiration for the drama series The Morning Show, which focuses on the life of people working in morning television. The series stars and is executive produced by Jennifer Aniston and Reese Witherspoon for Apple TV+.

References

External links

2013 non-fiction books
American non-fiction books
Books about television
Books about journalism
Non-fiction books adapted into television shows
Grand Central Publishing books